Enurmino (Chukchi: , Innurmin; Yupik language: Анушпик and also known as Ennurmin and Enyurmin) is a rural locality (a selo) in Chukotsky District of Chukotka Autonomous Okrug, Russia. It is located on the Chukchi Sea near Cape Serdtse-Kamen. Population:  Municipally, Enurmino is subordinated to Chukotsky Municipal District and incorporated as Enurmino Rural Settlement.

History

Pre-Soviet Period
The name of the village comes from the Chukchi I'nnurmin, meaning "a place behind the hills", as the village is located in a valley surrounded by hills. Nearby discoveries have revealed the site of an older village where the ancestors of those who live in Enurmino used to live, with the site of the village itself sitting on top of an ancient Chukchi settlement. Nearby the village is the abandoned settlement of Chegitun, occupied from about 500 AD to the twentieth century, until the village was closed and the population transferred to Inchoun.

Soviet Period
In 1926, the village had a population of 103, which grew to 275 by 1943, consisting of 259 Chukchi, 1 Yupik and 15 visitors. During the Soviet period, the people of Enurmino, in collaboration with the people of Neshkan further down the northern Chukotka coast, formed the Sovkhoz 50th Anniversary of the Great October. In addition to the Sovkhoz, there was also a polar station in the village called Netten,. The staff at this polar station used to play chess games over the radio with scientists at polar stations in the Antarctic.

Demographics
In 1926-27, Enurmino consisted of 19 households containing 103 Chukchi. This had risen to 275 people by 1943, including 259 Chukchi, 15 Yupik and one person classified as a "visitor" upon whose nationality the source does not elaborate, though these figures are combined totals for both Enurmino and the, now abandoned, nearby village of Pouten. The population had increased further to 290 by 1989, of whom 260 were Chukchi and the remaining 30 classified again as "visitors" and again, as of March 2003, to 297, of which 296 were indigenous peoples.

Culture
In 2008, a documentary was made on the lives of the inhabitants of Enurmino by Anadyr-born director, Alexey Vakhrushev, entitled Welcome to Enurmino!, which shows the villagers trying to preserve their traditional ways of life while making the most of the limited modern amenities available to them.

Economy
The main activities of the villagers are Marine mammal harvest, hunting and fishing and 7-8% of the population are actively involved in hunting.

The village has a food store, an elementary school, a daycare center and a post-office.

Transport
Enurmino is not connected to any other part of the world by permanent road and is 200 miles away from the district centre Lavrentiya. The only ways to travel the village are by sea, helicopter or winter road. There is, however, a very small network of roads within the village including:

 Улица Советская (Ulitsa Sovetskaya, lit. Soviet Street)
 Улица Южная (Ulitsa Yuzhnaya, lit. South Street)

Climate

See also
List of inhabited localities in Chukotsky District

References

Notes

Sources

 
 
Strogoff, M, Brochet, P-C and Auzias, D. Petit Futé: Chukotka, "Avant-Garde" Publishing House, 2006.

Rural localities in Chukotka Autonomous Okrug
Chukchi Sea
Populated places of Arctic Russia